Spring rite of Juraŭski Karahod is a ritual performed by the residents of  village, Žytkavičy District, Homieĺ Region, Belarus on St. George's Day. In 2019, it was inscribed on the UNESCO List of Intangible Cultural Heritage in Need of Urgent Safeguarding.

References

External links
 

Intangible Cultural Heritage in Need of Urgent Safeguarding